Beyg Baghi may refer to:
 Beyg Baghi, Ardabil
 Beyg Baghi, Qazvin